Thomas Fearn Frist (December 15, 1910 – January 4, 1998) was an American physician and businessman who co-founded the Hospital Corporation of America.

Early life
Thomas Fearn Frist Sr. was born on December 15, 1910 in Meridian, Mississippi, the son of Jennie (Jones) Frist and Jacob C. Frist. He received his undergraduate education from the University of Mississippi and his medical degree from Vanderbilt University.

Dr. Frist served as a Major in the Army Air Corps in World War II.

Career
Frist began his career as a cardiologist in the Nashville area. In 1968, with his son, Dr. Thomas F. Frist Jr., and Jack C. Massey, who helped Harland Sanders create the Kentucky Fried Chicken chain, he co-founded Hospital Corporation of America (HCA), the largest private operator of health care facilities in the world, taking the company public in 1969.  He is widely regarded as "the father of the modern for-profit hospital system" in the U.S.

Personal life
He was married to Dorothy Cate. Tommy and Dorothy used a positive reinforcement method of parenting with their three sons and two daughters:  Thomas F. Frist Jr. (physician, businessman, and philanthropist); Robert A. Frist (physician); Bill Frist (physician and U.S. Senator); Dorothy F. Boensch; and Mary F. Barfield.

In a letter addressed "For my family and future generations with great love," dated his 87th birthday, Frist writes, "I believe there is a God and in Jesus Christ. The only prayer I ever pray is thanking God for all the blessing I have . . . God in his wisdom, knows what you need." Frist grew up in the Presbyterian Church in Meridian, Mississippi, where he claims to have never missed a Sunday from age three to eighteen.

Death
Dr. Thomas F. Frist Sr. died in Nashville on January 4, 1998  and is interred at Mount Olivet Cemetery.

References

External links
 

1910 births
1998 deaths
People from Meridian, Mississippi
People from Nashville, Tennessee
University of Mississippi alumni
Vanderbilt University alumni
HCA Healthcare people
Frist family
American Presbyterians
Burials at Mount Olivet Cemetery (Nashville)